Elverdinge is a village in the Flemish province of West Flanders in Belgium. The village is part of the municipality of Ypres.

In World War I, the village was part of the Ypres Salient.

There are 5 Commonwealth War Graves Commission Cemeteries in Elverdinge : 
Bleuet Farm Cemetery
Canada Farm Cemetery
Ferme-Olivier Cemetery
Hagle Dump Cemetery
Hospital Farm Cemetery

Ypres
Populated places in West Flanders